David Frost Sellin (13 April 1930, Philadelphia, Pennsylvania – 11 April 2006, Washington, D.C.) was an American art historian, curator, educator, and author. He taught at a number of universities, worked on the staffs of several museums, and served as curator of the U.S. Capitol, 1976-1980.

Biography
He was born in Philadelphia, Pennsylvania, the son of Thorsten and Amy Anderson Sellin. He attended Quaker schools. As a teenager, he studied privately with painter Frank B. A. Linton, a former student of Thomas Eakins. He spent a year in Sweden in the atelier of painter Otte Sköld. He received a bachelor's degree, 1952 magna cum laude, and a master's degree in art history, 1956, from the University of Pennsylvania. He returned to Stockholm to study for a year at the Royal Swedish Academy of Arts, and studied for two years in Rome as a Fulbright scholar.

He returned to Philadelphia, worked as an assistant curator at the Philadelphia Museum of Art, 1958-1960, and served as administrator of schools at the Pennsylvania Academy of the Fine Arts (PAFA), 1960-1962. He completed a doctorate in art history at the University of Pennsylvania, 1968.

His research into the influence of France on 19th-century Philadelphia artists – notably Joseph A. Bailly, Mary Cassatt, Eakins, and Howard Roberts – culminated in a 1973 exhibition at the Philadelphia Museum of Art. Sellin curated three additional exhibitions featuring Eakins as a subject—American Art in the Making: Preparatory Studies for Masterpieces of American Painting, 1800-1900 (Smithsonian Institution, 1976); Thomas Eakins, Susan Macdowell Eakins, Elizabeth Macdowell Kenton (PAFA, 1977); and Thomas Eakins and His Fellow Artists at the Philadelphia Sketch Club (Philadelphia Sketch Club, 2001). His research into expatriate American artists who settled in France led to a 1982 joint exhibition by PAFA and the Phoenix Art Museum, that also traveled to France.

He was a lecturer at the University of Pennsylvania, Harvard University, American University, Tulane University, the University of Texas, and other universities. While serving on the faculties of Colgate University, 1963-1968, and Wesleyan University, 1969-1972, he also directed their art galleries.

He moved to Washington, D.C. in 1971, to work as a research fellow at what became the Smithsonian Museum of American Art. As curator of the U.S. Capitol, 1976-1980, he oversaw restoration of four of the massive paintings in the Rotunda, and conserved hundreds of architectural drawings by Thomas U. Walter, architect of the Capitol's dome.

He published numerous articles on American artists, and worked as an independent curator and consultant.

Exhibitions
 African Art and the School of Paris, Colgate University, 1966.
 The First Pose: Howard Roberts, Thomas Eakins, and a Century of Philadelphia Nudes, Philadelphia Museum of Art, 1973.
 American Art in the Making: Preparatory Studies for Masterpieces of American Painting, 1800-1900, Smithsonian Institution, 1976.
 Thomas Eakins, Susan Macdowell Eakins, Elizabeth Macdowell Kenton, Pennsylvania Academy of the Fine Arts, 1977.
 Americans in Brittany and Normandy, 1860-1910, Pennsylvania Academy of the Fine Arts and Phoenix Art Museum, 1982, co-curated with James K. Ballinger.
 William Lamb Picknell, 1853–1897, Taggart & Jurgensen Gallery, Washington, D.C., 1991.
 The Ipswich Painters at Home and Abroad: Dow, Kenyon, Mansfield, Richardson, Wendel; Cape Anne Historical Society, 1993, co-curated with Stephanie R. Gaskins.
 Thomas Eakins and His Fellow Artists at the Philadelphia Sketch Club, Philadelphia Sketch Club, 2001. Mark Sullivan contributed an essay to the catalogue.

Publications
 "A Benbridge Conversation Piece," Philadelphia Museum of Art Bulletin, 1961.
 "Denis A. Volozan, Philadelphia Neoclassicist," Winterthur Portfolio 4, 1968, 118-128.
 "1876: Turning Point in American Art," Fairmount Park Art Association Annual Report, Philadelphia, 1975.
 "The First Pose, 1876: Turing Point in American Art-Howard Roberts, Thomas Eakins, and a Century of Philadelphia Nudes", W.W. Norton & Company, Inc, New York, 1976,
 "Frieseke in Le Pouldu and Giverny: The Black Gang and the Giverny Group," Frederick Carl Frieseke: The Evolution of an American Expressionism, Telfair Museum of Art, 2001.
 "Imogene Robinson Morrell (1837–1908)," Resource Library Magazine, November 8, 2002.

Personal
He married Anne C. Robertson, 27 November 1965. He died of lymphatic cancer in Washington, D.C., 11 April 2006.

References

External links

1930 births
2006 deaths
American art historians
American art curators
Writers from Philadelphia
University of Pennsylvania alumni
People from Washington, D.C.
Colgate University faculty
Wesleyan University faculty
Pennsylvania Academy of the Fine Arts faculty
People associated with the Philadelphia Museum of Art
Directors of museums in the United States
Smithsonian Institution people
People associated with the Pennsylvania Academy of the Fine Arts
Historians from Pennsylvania
Historians from New York (state)